Drarga or Drargua is a rural commune and town in western Morocco, situated in the suburban area of Agadir, in the Souss-Massa region. The 2004 census recorded a population of 17,059 inhabitants in the urban centre, which increased to 50,946 inhabitants in the 2014 census. The commune as a whole recorded a population of 70,793 in the 2014 census. Located in Drarga is the Agadir Crocodile park tourist attraction.

References

External links
 Drarga Press

Populated places in Agadir-Ida Ou Tanane Prefecture
Rural communes of Souss-Massa
Cities in Morocco